Mory is the name or part of the name of three communes of France:
Mory, Pas-de-Calais in the Pas-de-Calais département
Mory-Montcrux in the Oise département
Mitry-Mory in the Seine-et-Marne département
Mory is also the name of two locations in Poland:
Mory, Pułtusk County in Masovian Voivodeship (east-central Poland)
Mory, Warsaw West County in Masovian Voivodeship (east-central Poland)

See also
Morey (disambiguation)
Maury (disambiguation)
Morley (disambiguation)